James Douglass may refer to:
James Nicholas Douglass (1826–1898), British civil engineer and lighthouse designer
James W. Douglass (born 1937), American author, theologian, and activist
Jimmy Douglass, American record producer

See also
James Douglas (disambiguation)